Leyla'nın Evi is a Turkish romantic drama television series which is not broadcast yet in Turkey. The title, which is similar to that of Zülfü Livaneli's book "Leyla'nın Evi", is very different and is not an adaptation of that book. It is about a woman, Leyla (Ahu Türkpençe), who after the murder of her beloved husband, Ramazan, tries to find happiness with her two children, Mehmet (Çağatay Ulusoy) and Merve (Irmak Ceren Öztürk)

Plot

2002, Berlin.
Leyla and Ramazan Özdemir live a happy life with their two children, Mehmet and Merve. Leyla was forced to marry with Ramazan when she was 16 years old and, suddenly, she became a housewife with two children. Ramazan, a middle-aged man, works as a builder in a poor neighborhood for a famous construction company. Mehmet is a young child around 10 years old. His dream is to be good-hearted and to help people in need. Merve is 2 years old. One night, Ramazan is found killed. He was killed by his two bosses, Şükrü (Metin Çekmez) and Burcu Yıldız (Perihan Savaş).

2012, İstanbul.
Leyla and her two children live in İstanbul. Leyla seems to have got over her husband's death. So, she gets married with Celal (Yavuz Bingöl). Merve goes to school and has many friends and she is very famous. However, Mehmet, has not got over his father's murder yet. He wants to take revenge from the murderers of his father. So, he decides to go to Berlin, so that he can find more about his mysterious death. During the flight he meets Damla (Selen Soyder). They fall in love to each other and become a couple. As the days go by, Mehmet and Damla decide to get married and return to İstanbul to meet with the parents of each other. When Mehmet, returns to İstanbul, he finds out that his mother is married and that Damla's parents are the killers of his father, something that even Damla does not know!

Cast

Ahu Türkpençe - Leyla Özdemir/Hüzün (Mehmet's mother)
Çağatay Ulusoy - Mehmet Özdemir
Selen Soyder - Damla Yıldız (Mehmet's fiancée)
Yavuz Bingöl - Celal Hüzün (Leyla's second husband)
Menderes Samancılar - Ramazan Özdemir (Mehmet's father)
Nur Fettahoğlu - Zehra Yılmaz (Leyla's younger sister)
Mehmet Çevik - Aslan Yılmaz (Zehra's husband)
Ayla Algan - Hatice Şentürk (Leyla's mother, Mehmet's grandmother)
Sema Mumcu - Cemile Bozkurt (Ayhan's daughter, Mehmet's cousin)
Cemal Hünal - Demir Dönmez (Mehmet's best friend)
Sema Keçik - Işıl Yeşilyurt (Şükrü's secretary)
Boncuk Yılmaz - Hacer Öztürk (Leyla's closest friend)
Nalan Yavuz - Lale Akça (Yildiz family's maid)
Uğur Polat - Orhan Han (Ramazan's closest friend)
Gülşen Tuncer - Ayhan Balıkçı (Ramazan's older sister)
Irmak Ceren Öztürk - Merve Özdemir (Leyla's daughter, Mehmet's sister)
Metin Çekmez - Yavuz Şentürk (Leyla's father, Mehmet's grandfather)
Perihan Savaş - Burcu Yıldız (Damla's mother)
Fikret Hakan - Şükrü Yıldız (Damla's father, Ramazan's murderer)

References 

Turkish drama television series
2013 Turkish television series debuts
Star TV (Turkey) original programming